The Zeughausgasse (Armory lane) is one of the streets in the Old City of Bern, the medieval city center of Bern, Switzerland.  It is part of the Innere Neustadt which was built during the second expansion in 1255 to 1260.  The eastern end is at Kornhausplatz while the western end is at Waisenhausplatz.  It is part of the UNESCO Cultural World Heritage Site that encompasses the Old City.

History
Zeughausgasse was originally called vor den Predigern after the nearby Prediger Abbey. The Dominican abbey was built throughout the 13th and 14th centuries. In 1527 the abbey was secularized and the street changed names to Beim Totentanz after a Dance of Death painting cycle by Niklaus Manuels on the abbey wall. Even though the painting was destroyed in the 17th century, the street remained Beim Totentanz until the 18th century. In 1745 it was renamed Zeughausgasse and widened. The Zeughaus or armory, that the street was named after, had originally been a workhouse for the abbey and occupied what would become Zeughausgasse 18-28, Nägeligasse 4-6 and 7-13. In 1876 the old armory was demolished and in 1880 the street was widened.

Sights
The former city council hall for the outer city at Zeughausgasse 17 is a Swiss heritage site of national significance.  Two other sites, the former Kornhaus (a type of granary) which is now a museum and the city theatre, are at the end of Zeughausgasse but with a Kornhausplatz address.

References

Streets in Bern
Odonyms referring to a building
Old City (Bern)
Cultural property of national significance in the canton of Bern